Foresthill is a census-designated place (CDP) in Placer County, California, United States. It is part of the Sacramento–Arden-Arcade–Roseville Metropolitan Statistical Area. The population was 1,483 at the 2010 census, down from 1,791 at the 2000 census.

History 
Foresthill is located on a broad ridge between the North and Middle Forks of the American River on the gold-bearing gravel bed of an ancient river.

In the spring of 1850, miners came to the Forest Hill Divide in large numbers. There was one route from Auburn through Yankee Jim's and one from Coloma. At the junction of these trails, the Forest House hotel and trading post was built. The height of mining activity in Foresthill began in 1853 after a winter landslide at the head of Jenny Lind Canyon exposed numerous nuggets of gold. The Jenny Lind mine produced about $2,500 of gold a day for a while, up to a total output over $1 million by 1880. The combined production of all the mines in the Forest Hill area was estimated at $10 million by 1868 with gold selling for $16 an ounce.

By 1857, this area had become an important center for trade among the many gold camps on the divide. In 1862, the Hardy-Kennedy building was erected - the first fireproof store in Foresthill. This building, now known as the Langstaff building, is still being used by the merchants of Foresthill.

By 1880, Foresthill was one of the largest towns in Placer County. Today the town has a marker identifying it as a California Historical Landmark.

Geography

Climate
Foresthill has a hot-summer Mediterranean climate that is characterized by cool, wet winters and hot, dry summers (Köppen climate classification Csa).

Points of Interest
Foresthill Bridge

Demographics

The 2010 United States Census reported that Foresthill had a population of 1,483. The racial makeup of Foresthill was 1,371 (92.4%) White, 8 (0.5%) African American, 29 (2.0%) Native American, 6 (0.4%) Asian, 2 (0.1%) Pacific Islander, 17 (1.1%) from other races, and 50 (3.4%) from two or more races. Hispanic or Latino of any race were 97 persons (6.5%).

The Census reported that 1,483 people (100% of the population) lived in households, 0 (0%) lived in non-institutionalized group quarters, and 0 (0%) were institutionalized.

There were 625 households, out of which 182 (29.1%) had children under the age of 18 living in them, 314 (50.2%) were opposite-sex married couples living together, 66 (10.6%) had a female householder with no husband present, 45 (7.2%) had a male householder with no wife present.  There were 49 (7.8%) unmarried opposite-sex partnerships, and 9 (1.4%) same-sex married couples or partnerships. 140 households (22.4%) were made up of individuals, and 53 (8.5%) had someone living alone who was 65 years of age or older. The average household size was 2.37.  There were 425 families (68.0% of all households); the average family size was 2.76.

The population was spread out, with 301 people (20.3%) under the age of 18, 118 people (8.0%) aged 18 to 24, 304 people (20.5%) aged 25 to 44, 540 people (36.4%) aged 45 to 64, and 220 people (14.8%) who were 65 years of age or older.  The median age was 45.7 years. For every 100 females, there were 99.1 males.  For every 100 females age 18 and over, there were 100.0 males.

The homeowner vacancy rate was 1.4%; the rental vacancy rate was 6.0%.  965 people (65.1% of the population) lived in owner-occupied housing units and 518 people (34.9%) lived in rental housing units.

References

External links
 Foresthill Divide Museum

Census-designated places in Placer County, California
California Historical Landmarks
Census-designated places in California